Gabon made its Paralympic Games début at the 2008 Summer Paralympics in Beijing, sending a single athlete  (wheelchair athlete Thierry Mabicka) to compete in track and field. Mabicka entered two events: the 800m race (T54 category), and the javelin (F57/58). In the former, he was disqualified, apparently "for attempting to race others with a non-racing wheelchair". In the latter, he finished last of fourteen, his throw of 11.72m earning him 302 points.

Full results for Gabon at the Paralympics

See also
 Gabon at the Olympics

References